Jan Rot (25 December 1957 – 22 April 2022) was a Dutch singer-songwriter born in Makassar, who was famous in the Netherlands for his many translations of songs, pop as well as classical ones. His Dutch translation of Bach's St Matthew Passion peaked in the Dutch pop album charts at Easter 2006. In 2021, Rot was diagnosed with terminal cancer; he continued performing till April 2022 and died in Rotterdam on 22 April.

References

External links
Official website (in Dutch)
 
 

1957 births
2022 deaths
Dutch singer-songwriters
People from Makassar
Deaths from cancer in the Netherlands
Deaths from colorectal cancer